Alfred William (Willy) Finch (1854 –1930) was a ceramist and painter in the pointillist and Neo-Impressionist style. Born in Brussels to British parents, he spent most of his creative life in Finland.

Life and work

Alfred William Finch was born on 28 November 1854 in Brussels, Belgium to British parents, Joseph Finch (a businessman) and Emma Finch (née Holach). He spent his youth in Ostende. When he was twenty-four he began studying for one year in Brussels at the Académie Royale des Beaux-Arts.

On 28 October 1883 he became a founding member of Les XX, a group of twenty Belgian painters, designers and sculptors, who rebelled against the prevailing artistic standards and outmoded academism. He was impressed by the works of Georges Seurat and Paul Signac and changed his own painting style from a more realistic approach into a pointillistic style. In the following years, Finch became one of the leading representatives of his style in Belgium, along with Théo van Rysselberghe.

During the early 1890s Finch switched careers from painting to pottery, upon the realization that he couldn't make a living by painting.

In 1897, invited by count Louis Sparre, Finch moved to Porvoo, Finland, to head the Iris ceramics factory, and influenced the development of the local Jugendstil. After the factory was closed, Finch resumed his painting career.

Finch died in Helsinki on 28 April 1930.

Works

References

External links

Alfred Finch biography on the Glasgow University web site

1854 births
1930 deaths
Belgian painters
Post-impressionist painters
Belgian potters
Finnish potters
Belgian people of British descent
Belgian expatriates in Finland